The Last Shot is a 1951 West German drama film directed by Franz Seitz and starring Angelika Hauff, Viktor Staal and Heinrich Gretler. It is part of the post-war group of heimatfilm, set in rural Southern Germany.

It was made by a Munich-based independent company at the Bavaria Studios. It was produced by the director's son Franz Seitz. Location shooting took place around the Schliersee in Bavaria. The film's sets were designed by Ernst H. Albrecht and Arne Flekstad.

Cast
 Angelika Hauff as Hanni Manhard
 Viktor Staal as Thomas Scharrer
 Heinrich Gretler as Scharrer, Neuwirt
 Adolf Gondrell as Forstmeister Manhard
 Gustl Gstettenbaur as Jäger Martin
 Hans Terofal as Quirin, Knecht beim Neuwirt
 Georg Vogelsang as Gröberbauer
 Georg Bauer as Jäger Bartl
 Elise Aulinger as Gröberbäuerin
 Ilse Fitz as Loni, Tochter vom Gröberhof
 Paula Braend as Frau Manhard
 Theodolinde Müller as Afra, Sennerin

References

Bibliography
 James Robert Parish. Film Actors Guide. Scarecrow Press, 1977.

External links 
 

1951 films
German drama films
1951 drama films
West German films
1950s German-language films
Films directed by Franz Seitz
Films shot at Bavaria Studios
German black-and-white films
1950s German films